KLER (1300 AM) is a radio station in the western United States, broadcasting a country music format in Orofino, Idaho. The station is currently owned by Jeffery and Monica Jones, through licensee Central Idaho Broadcasting, Inc., and features programming from ABC Radio  and Jones Radio Network.

KLER broadcasts Major League Baseball as an affiliate of the Seattle Mariners radio network.

History of call letters
The call letters KLER were previously assigned to a station in Rochester, Minnesota. It broadcast on 970 kHz with 500 W power (daytime). That station became an ABC affiliate October 1, 1948. The station was bought out by KROC and signed off May 31, 1952. From as early as 1964 and throughout the 1980s, its call-letters changed to KOZE-AM with a Top-40 format.

References

External links

LER
Country radio stations in the United States